

North America / Turtle Island 

 Native American people by occupation
 Native American people by ethnic or national origin and occupation
 First Nations people by occupation

Academics 

 First Nations academics
 Indigenous women academics in Canada
 Native American academics

Activists 

 First Nations activists
 First Nations lawyers
 Native American activists
 Indigenous leaders in British Columbia

Artists 

 List of Native American artists
 Professional Native Indian Artists Inc. (The "Indigenous Group of Seven")

Authors 

 First Nations women writers
 19th-century First Nations writers
 20th-century First Nations writers
 21st-century First Nations writers

Inventors and scientists 

 List of Alaska Native inventors and scientists

The Americas 

 Indigenous people of the Americas by occupation

Academics 

 Indigenous academics of the Americas

Authors 

  List of writers from peoples indigenous to the Americas

Europe and Russia 

 List of Sámi people
 Notable Nenets (the Nenets are Indigenous people in Siberia)

Australasia (Australia and Aotearoa) 

Lists of Indigenous Australians by occupation and/or historical contribution:

 List of Indigenous Australian historical figures
 List of Indigenous Australian musicians
 List of Indigenous Australian performing artists
 List of Indigenous Australians in politics and public service, education, law and humanities
 List of Indigenous Australian sportspeople
 List of VFL/AFL and AFL Women's players of Indigenous Australian descent
 List of Indigenous Australian visual artists
 List of Indigenous Australian writers

Indigenous Australians
 
Indigenous
Lists of black people